{{DISPLAYTITLE:C38H30}}
The molecular formula C38H30 (molar mass: 486.64 g/mol, exact mass: 486.2348 u) may refer to:

 Hexaphenylethane
 Gomberg's dimer

Molecular formulas